The United Kingdom Accreditation Service (UKAS) is the sole national accreditation body recognised by the British government to assess the competence of organisations that provide certification, testing, inspection and calibration services. It evaluates these conformity assessment bodies and then accredits them where they are found to meet relevant internationally specified standards.

Functions
UKAS assesses conformity assessment bodies for competence against internationally recognised standards
UKAS accredits (recognising competence of organisations to provide conformity assessment tasks)
UKAS issues accreditation certificates and schedules showing the limits of the accreditation for a particular conformity assessment body and permits the use of the UKAS mark on accredited certification provided that it is accompanied by the UKAS Accreditation Number of the accredited body.  The validity of an accreditation should be checked on the UKAS website. UKAS certificates do not bear an expiry date.

History
UKAS was set up in 1995 under a memorandum of understanding with the British government (between UKAS and the then Secretary of State for Trade and Industry). It resulted from the merger in 1995 of NAMAS (National Measurement Accreditation Service) and NACCB (National Accreditation Council for Certification Bodies). NAMAS was itself the result of a merger in 1985 of NATLAS (National Testing Laboratory Accreditation Scheme) formed in 1981 and BCS (British Calibration Service) formed in 1966.

Structure
UKAS is a non-profit-distributing private company, it is operated in the public interest as a company limited by guarantee.  It employs 190 staff and over 250 technical external assessors / experts.

UKAS has members (instead of shareholders) who represent those who have an interest in accreditation – national and local government, business and industry, purchasers, users and quality managers. The present members are:
 Secretary of State for Business, Energy and Industrial Strategy
 The Association of British Certification Bodies
 British Measurement and Testing Association
 Confederation of British Industry
 The Secretary of State for the Environment, Food and Rural Affairs
 Federation of Small Businesses
 The Local Authorities Coordinating Body of Regulatory Services
 Chartered Institute of Procurement & Supply
 The Chartered Quality Institute
 The Safety Assessment Federation
 Food Standards Agency
 Defence Procurement Agency
 Health and Safety Executive
 Public Health Laboratory Services
 British Retail Consortium

In 2010 UKAS acquired the CPA (Clinical Pathology Accreditation) from the medical royal colleges. It started ISAS (Imaging Services Accreditation Scheme) for the Royal College of Radiologists and the College of Radiographers.

Standards covered
 ISO/IEC 17025
 ISO 15189
 ISO/IEC 17020
 ISO/IEC 17021
 ISO 9001
 ISO 14001
 ISO 13485
 ISO 22000
 ISO 45001
 ISO/IEC 27001
 ISO 50001
 ISO 55001
 ISO 22301
 ISO/IEC 17024
 ISO/IEC 17065
 ISO/IEC 17043
 ISO 17034
 ISO/IEC 14065
 ISO/IEC 17029
 ISO 20387

See also
 Chartered Quality Institute

References

External links
 United Kingdom Accreditation Service
 ISAS
 European co-operation for Accreditation

1995 establishments in the United Kingdom
Accreditation organizations
Borough of Runnymede
Department for Business, Innovation and Skills
Government agencies established in 1995
Organisations based in Surrey
Private companies limited by guarantee of the United Kingdom
Quality assurance